Unión Deportiva Almería "B" is a Spanish football team based in Almería, in the autonomous community of Andalusia. Founded in 2001, it is the reserve team of UD Almería and currently plays in Tercera Federación – Group 9, holding home games at Anexo Power Horse Stadium, with a 13,648 seat capacity.

Season to season

7 seasons in Segunda División B
12 seasons in Tercera División
2 seasons in Tercera Federación
1 season in Categorías Regionales

Current squad
.

From Youth Academy

Out on loan

Technical staff

Notable former players
Note: this list includes players that have appeared in at least 100 league games and/or have reached international status.

Former managers
See UD Almería B managers.
 Esteban Navarro
 Fran Fernández
 Francisco
 Miguel Rivera

References

External links
Official website 
Futbolme team profile 

Football clubs in Andalusia
B
Association football clubs established in 2001
Spanish reserve football teams
2001 establishments in Spain